George Anthony (25 June 1875 – 13 May 1907) was an English first-class first-class cricketer. He made 85 appearances for Nottinghamshire between August 1900 and June 1905, scoring 1722 runs and taking 82 wickets. He died just two years after making his last first-class appearance, at the age of 31. He made his best score, 89, against Derbyshire while his best bowling, 6 for 72, came against Leicestershire. His brother, Henry Anthony and uncle Alfred Anthony also played for Nottinghamshire, with rather less distinction. His brother Walter Anthony won a football championship medal with Blackburn Rovers in 1912.

References

External links

English cricketers
Nottinghamshire cricketers
English cricketers of 1890 to 1918
1875 births
1907 deaths
People from Arnold, Nottinghamshire
Cricketers from Nottinghamshire